Chintu Chinki Aur Ek Badi Si Love Story is a SAB TV comedy TV show. It was produced by JD Majethia and Aatish Kapadia from Hats Off Productions and co-produced by Rajesh Kumar, Ashish Khurana and Rajat Vyas from 3 Cheers Production.

Plot
Set in the present time Bhopal, the serial revolves around the love story of Mr Chintu and Miss Chinki. Chintu stays in a joint family and is a simple, innocent guy. He is famous in college and loved by his neighbours. Majority of decisions in the family are taken by elders and chintu knows the fact.  It is time for Chintu to get married as per his family wishes rather his own will.

Chinki is from a small family. She is independent-minded person but very soft and kind at heart. She is very clear that she needs to marry a guy who measures up to her father in thoughts and values. She loves her grandmother who believes in romance. Partially supporting Chinki is their loyal servant with whom the grand mother always fights.

Chintu accidentally meets Chinki and falls in love with her. In subsequent episodes the love story progresses with hits, misses, confusions. The love letters, family opposition, hidden meetings, and funny excuses to go on a date form the core part of the story. Chintu's friend Kishan is the major supporter who gives the ideas and get based too. Yet things get resolved, Chintu and Chinki get married.  After their marriage, the story revolves on how Chinki progresses from a nuclear family to a large joint family with Chintu. Thus the love story takes a journey of its own constrained by limitations of joint family beliefs and values.

Cast
 Rajesh Kumar as Chintu
 Divyanka Tripathi Dahiya as Chinki
 Dolly Minhas as Saraswati
 Rakesh Bedi as Jagat mama
 Abhishek Avasthi as Kishan
 S. M. Zaheer as Swatantra Swabha Dwivedi
 Nishikant Dixit
 Saurabh Raj Jain as Aman
 Deepak Dutta as Chintu's Father
 Harsh Khurana as Chintu's Uncle
 Jhuma Mitra as Chintu's Aunt

References

External links 

Sony SAB original programming
Indian comedy television series
2011 Indian television series debuts
2012 Indian television series endings
Television shows set in Madhya Pradesh
Hats Off Productions